Endem TV Tower is a TV tower in Büyükçekmece, Istanbul, Turkey. The total height of the tower is  including the antenna.

Helicopter crash

On March 10, 2017, a Sikorsky S-76 helicopter owned by Swan Aviation hit the antenna of the TV tower in heavy fog and crashed onto the nearby highway State Road D100. All seven people on board were killed.

See also 
 Çamlıca TRT Television Tower
 Küçük Çamlıca TV Radio Tower
 List of columns and towers in Istanbul

References

External links
 Emporis.com
 

Towers with revolving restaurants
Towers completed in 2008
Communication towers in Turkey
Beylikdüzü
2002 establishments in Turkey
Round towers
Observation towers in Turkey
Towers in Istanbul